Wahlburgers is a reality television series on the A&E network in the United States that aired from January 22, 2014, to July 31, 2019. It is a behind-the-scenes look at the titular chain of restaurants owned by chef Paul Wahlberg and his brothers, Mark and Donnie, as well as their home lives.

Overview

Episodes

Season 1 (2014)

Season 2 (2014)

Season 3 (2015)

Season 4 (2015)

Season 5 (2016)

Season 6 (2016)

Season 7 (2016-17)

Season 8 (2017)

Season 9 (2018)

Season 10 (2019)

References

External links
 Episode list at A&E
 

Lists of American reality television series episodes